The  Castle of Aamaj  (from ,, Aamaj castle is one of the most significant examples for trench-enclosed, fortified structures in the Kukherd District, Hormozgan Province in south Iran.

Location 
Aamaj castle was a squared fortified structure situated 1000 away from Kukherd city. It was built on a hill above the palm oasis at southern west of Kukherd city, a location which added significantly to its altitude and height. The structure was also sited near the monuments of ancient The Historic Bath of Siba. The total length of its interface from the south is about 111  metres, while its southern interface extends over 98.5 metres.

History 
The history of Aamaj castle dates back to the Sassanid era (226–651) when it was the center of government of that area, and also served as a fortified military base surrounded by a large trench. This trench was an ancient strategic feature used to defend Persian cities, castles and the forts prior to the Islamic era.

The Castle of Aamaj was maintained until 1163-1192 when it was damaged by an earthquake in Kukherd city. The remanning parts of the castle were then destroyed by a flood in 1367.

	

Castle of Siba
Bastak
Bandar Lengeh
Hormozgān
Maghoh
AL madani
Paraw Kukherd
The Historic Bath of Siba
Sassanid family tree — of the Sasanian (Sassanid) dynasty

References 

2.	الكوخردى ، محمد ، بن يوسف، (كُوخِرد حَاضِرَة اِسلامِيةَ عَلي ضِفافِ نَهر مِهران) الطبعة الثالثة ،دبى: سنة 199۷ للميلاد **Mohammed Kookherdi (1997) Kookherd, an Islamic civil at Mehran river,  third edition: Dubai
3.	محمدیان، کوخری، محمد ، “ (به یاد کوخرد) “، ج1. ج2. چاپ اول، دبی: سال انتشار 2003 میلادی Mohammed Kookherdi Mohammadyan (2003), Beyade Kookherd, third edition : Dubai.
4.محمدیان، کوخردی ، محمد ،  «شهرستان بستک و بخش کوخرد»  ، ج۱. چاپ اول، دبی: سال انتشار ۲۰۰۵ میلادی Mohammed Kookherdi Mohammadyan (2005), Shahrestan  Bastak & Bakhshe Kookherd, First edition : Dubai.
5.	Peter Jackson and Lawrence Lockhart (Ed) (1986), Vol. 6th,  The Cambridge History of Iran: Cambridge University Press
5.Human Anthropology in Persia
6.محمدیان، کوخری، محمد. (وصف کوخرد)  ج1. چاپ دوم، دبی: سال انتشار 1998 میلادی Mohammed Kookherdi Mohammadyan (1998), Wasf Kookherd, second  edition : Dubai
7.محمدیان ، کوخردی، محمد ،  « مشایخ مدنی »   ، چاپ دوم، دبی:   سال انتشار ۲۰۰۲ میلادی Mohammed Kookherdi Mohammadyan (2002), Mashaykh Madani, second  edition : Dubai
8. اطلس گیتاشناسی استان‌های ایران [Atlas Gitashenasi Ostanhai Iran] (Gitashenasi Province Atlas of Iran)
9. درگاه فهرست آثار ملی ایران 
10.« Huwala Arab History » Engineer: Mohammed gharhb Hatem,  third edition : Egypt (Cairo),1997 & 2013   
11.   «  Kookherd, an Islamic District on the bank of Mehran River»  Mohammadian, Kukherdi,Mohammad (2000), third edition:Dubai U.A.E

External links 
  Kookherd website.

Sasanian castles
Castles in Iran
Kukherd District
Archaeological sites in Iran
Monuments and memorials in Iran
Buildings and structures in Kukherd District
National works of Iran